Diploglossus bilobatus,  O'Shaughnessy's galliwasp, is a species of lizard of the Diploglossidae family. It is found in Costa Rica, Panama, and Nicaragua.

A 2021 study found it to not belong to the genus Diploglossus (which is otherwise only found in South America and the Caribbean), but rather to belong to the monotypic genus Mesoamericus in the subfamily Siderolamprinae. However, the Reptile Database has not followed this treatment.

References

Diploglossus
Reptiles described in 1874
Reptiles of Costa Rica
Reptiles of Panama
Reptiles of Nicaragua
Taxa named by Arthur William Edgar O'Shaughnessy